En Esta Noche (On Nights Like This in non-Spanish-speaking territories) is the debut bilingual studio album by Colombian-American singer-songwriter Soraya, released on February 6, 1996 by Island Records. All the songs on the album except "Pueblito Viejo" are original and were fully or partly composed by Soraya.

Soraya recorded this album over the course of two years in Abbey Road Studios in London. Musically the album is a fusion of many different genres and cultures from Colombia and world music.

Track listing

Charts

Year-end charts

Certifications and sales

! scope="row" |Colombia (ASINCOL)
| Gold
| 250,000
|-

References

1996 debut albums
Albums produced by Rod Argent
Soraya (musician) albums
Spanish-language albums
Island Records albums
London Records albums
Polydor Records albums